Established in 1951, with the Headquarters in Beirut, known simply as the General Union, it is a non-Governmental Organization that represents the Arab Private Sector on the regional and international levels.
the Private sector's need to pool Arab Economic Resources and Markets enhancing the Economic development led to the Creation of the General Union, which calls for Strengthening the Inner Arab Cooperation. The General Union assumes a major role in promoting cooperation among Arab Chambers and coordinates their efforts towards regional cooperation. It works towards promoting Arab economic interests abroad, particularly with respect to exports and for the rationalization of imports and investments.

Organization
The Organization is Made up of Four Important Corners:

General Conference: A biannual forum for Arab businessmen to discuss major issues relating to Arab economies and current economic developments, and to make proposals for enhancing cooperation and integration.
Union Council: Entrusted with devising the general policy of the Union and taking practical measures for promoting cooperation among Arab Chambers. It comprises representatives of all Arab Chambers and meets twice a year.
Executive Committee: It comprises the President of the Council, two Vice-Presidents, and four elected members. It meets prior to the meeting of the Council to prepare for its work.
Secretariat General: Is the executive organ of the Union and consists of the Secretary General, the Assistant Secretary General and assisting staff.

Committees

Trade Committee: This Committee was established in 1997 to sponsor the participation of Arab Chambers in the execution of the Arab Free Trade Area scheme.
Permanent Committee for Labor Affairs:Members of this Committee are nominated on a permanent basis to ensure a continuous follow-up in cooperation with the other two parties concerned with matters of labor affairs, namely the Governments and labor representatives.
Committee for Joint Arab-Foreign Chambers of Commerce: Members of this Committee are nominated by the Arab Chambers and Federations to follow-up issues of the Joint Arab-Foreign Chambers of Commerce. The term of this Committee is for three years.

External links

Organizations established in 1951
Arab League
Economy of the Arab League
1951 establishments in Lebanon